The Asian continent is one of the fastest-growing continents in the World, with increasing urbanisation and a high growth rate for cities. Tokyo in Japan is the world's largest metropolitan area by population.

The population of the given cities are obtained from five sources:
 Cities
 World Atlas
 National Official Estimate (NOE)

Out of these five sources, the highest estimate is shown in bold. The cities are ranked on the basis of their highest estimate of population. Some remarks:
 The official statistics for Chinese cities are for municipalities which usually extend well beyond the urban areas and comprise a substantial rural population. When such statistics exceed the estimated figures, as in the case for Chongqing, Wuhan and Shenyang, they are not taken into account.
 The figure for Shanghai from City Population includes the city of Suzhou (some 100 km or 62 miles northwest of Shanghai), which is not included in other estimates or in the official statistics and therefore is not taken into account.
 The figure for Guangzhou from City Population is for the urban population of the Guangdong province, also which includes the cities Shenzhen, Dongguan, Zhongshan, Jiangmen and Huizhou. The area has not yet been developed into a single metropolitan area and therefore this figure is not taken into account. Shenzhen and Dongguan are listed separately in this table.
 Demographia and world Atlas give figures for the contiguous cities of Quanzhou, Jinjiang and Shishi. City Population includes these three cities in its figures for Xiamen (population 4-4.8 million), giving a total population of 10,000,000. However, Xiamen is not actually contiguous with the three other cities and this statistic is not taken into account.
 The figure for Delhi from City Population includes the cities of Faridabad, Ghaziabad, Gurgaon, which are not included in other estimates or in the official statistics and therefore is not taken into account.
 The figure for Mumbai from City Population includes the cities of Bhiwandi, Kalyan, Thane, Ulhasnagar, Vasai-Virar which are not included in other estimates or in the official statistics and therefore is not taken into account.

The table is color-coded to show which region of Asia each city is in. The color-code key is as follows:

With twenty cities, East Asia accounts for half of cities under this list, with China having the most with fifteen cities, South Asia comes second with ten cities, seven of which are in India. Southeast Asia accounts for seven cities and West Asia with just four cities.

List

See also

References

Geography of Asia
Lists of cities by demography